Caroline Moore(born 10 August 1996), better known as MC Caro, is a Liberian rapper and songwriter.
 She gained recognition into the Liberian music industry through her viral free style" Pro Poor". MC Caro won Best Female Rapper of the Year Award at the 2020 MTN Liberia Music Awards.

Early life 
Mc Caro was Born and raised in New Kru Town community, by her parents Christiana T. Nagbe and Garpu Moore. She began her primary education at the Nimely Brothers Children Preparatory School, and later matriculated at the Ndee Matta Memorial Foundation, after her family migrated from New Kru Town to Gbanjor, Old Road. When she returned to New Kru Town, Caro enrolled at St. Lawrence Elementary & Junior High School for two years, and graduated to Senior High. Upon her graduation from the aforementioned, Caro furthered her senior year studies at St. Edwards and progressed. She was unable to advance her studies in college due to financial circumstances.

Music career
Caro started her rap journey in the underground scene of Liberia. Despite her life from the slum and unpopularity then, the stereotypes and cultural barriers, Caro brook through into the Liberian music industry in 2018 through her viral free style" Pro Poor".

In 2018, MC Caro made a viral song "Bring Back our Moni" voicing out her frustrations about the missing two shipping containers with one hundred million dollars. The song won the hearts of many due to its brutal stance on corruption.

Discography

Singles
"I na talking to you" (2018)
"For D Bae" (2018)
"Bring Our Money Back" (2018)
"One More Round" (2018)
"Listen" (2018)
"Ley Light Go Off" (2020)
"In the House" (2020)
"Uncle Solomon" (2020)
"PSA" (2020)
"Don’t Ask Me" (2020)
"One More Round" (2020)
"Ley Light Go Off" (2020)
"Beat wind Cypher" (2021)
"Cinderella" (2021)

Collaborative songs
"Dudu" with Christoph The Change
"Pull Up" with Feouls

Awards and nominations

MTN Liberia Music Awards 
2019 MTN Liberia Music Awards New Artist of the Year, Nominee
2019 MTN Liberia Music Awards Hipco/Trapco Song of the Year- One More Round, Nominee
2020 MTN Liberia Music Awards Female Artist of the Year, Won
2020 MTN Liberia Music Awards Hipco/Trapco Artist of the Year, Nominee

References

Living people
Liberian songwriters
Musicians from Monrovia
Liberian singers
1996 births